Oedaspis trifasciata is a species of tephritid or fruit flies in the genus Oedaspis of the family Tephritidae.

Distribution
 Australia

References

Tephritinae
Insects described in 1939
Diptera of Australasia